The Eopsettinae are a subfamily of fish in the family Pleuronectidae.

Genera
 Atheresthes
 Eopsetta

Pleuronectidae